St Bees School is a co-educational private school in the English public school tradition, located in the West Cumbrian village of St Bees, England. It was founded in 1583 by Edmund Grindal, the Archbishop of Canterbury, as a boys' free grammar school. The school remained small, with fewer than 40 pupils, until the expansions of the Victorian era, paid for by mineral revenues, and helped by the arrival of the railway, until by the First World War there were 300 pupils.

The 1930s saw a large decrease in numbers due to the Great Depression, but these rose again during World War II, and this was followed by an era of further expansion. In 1978, the school became co-educational.

On Friday 13 March 2015, it was announced by the school governors that due to falling pupil numbers, the school would temporarily close in summer 2015. On 6 September 2018 the school re-opened in a partnership with Full Circle Education Group. Numbers at the school have continued to increase; as of 2020 there are over 50 students.

Grounds and buildings 

The buildings around the main quadrangle in the Foundation block are Grade II listed. This includes the original schoolroom on the lower northern side of the quadrangle. The main campus is now concentrated around Wood Lane, adjacent to the Foundation block.

History 

The school was founded in 1583 by Edmund Grindal, Archbishop of Canterbury, who was born in St Bees, at Cross Hill House. The oldest part of the school, now known as Foundation opposite the Priory Church, was built by 1587. Thanks to an agreement with Queen's College Oxford, and the purchase of local tithes, the school prospered both financially and academically.

Although specifically incorporated for the education of boys from Cumberland and Westmorland, as early as 1604 pupils from outside those counties were being educated at St Bees, but the school only slowly expanded. The school enjoyed financial security for many years, but this was threatened from 1742 onwards when Sir James Lowther fraudulently obtained an 867-year lease for the extensive mineral rights for a paltry sum, on which much of the prosperity of the Lowthers was built. As a result of this fraud being exposed in 1812, the case eventually went to Court of Chancery and in 1842 enough compensation was paid by the Lowthers to build the present open quadrangle, incorporating the original schoolhouse. Further expansion followed, helped by more equitable mineral revenues, with the purchase of the Royal Hotel to become Grindal House, and the construction of School House and the headmaster's residence on Wood Lane. By 1900, the school's chapel, additional classrooms, the library, swimming baths, Gymnasium, science labs and lecture theatre had been built. By the outbreak of the First World War, the school had reached three hundred pupils.

During the First World War, old boys of the school were awarded the Victoria Cross. (See St. Bees V.C. winners for more details). Old boy Alfred Critchley became one of the youngest Brigadier-Generals, at the age of 27. One hundred and eighty old boys and staff died during the war, and a memorial was built overlooking the sports fields where so many had previously played.

After the war, in common with many other schools, the numbers decreased, especially in the 1930s. The situation became so critical that the governors attempted to have the school nationalized. In the end, the old boys put together a rescue package and the school remained independent.

Help was at hand though, for during the Second World War, Mill Hill School was evacuated to St Bees after their buildings were occupied by the government. Under-used facilities could now be put to good use, to the financial benefit of St Bees School. The two schools remained independently run, and sports teams from each school would frequently play each other. The cadet corps of the two schools combined with village volunteers to form the St Bees Home Guard.

Post-war expansion 
Seventy-two old boys died during the Second World War, and the Memorial Hall was erected in their memory. During the 1950s, a new science block was built, formally opened by Barnes Wallis in 1959, and in the 1970s the school became co-educational. New boarding houses were purchased off-campus for both girls and boys, Bega House and Abbot's Court respectively. To celebrate the school's quatercentenary in 1983, an appeal was launched which would give the school a new sports hall, opened in 1988.

The 1990s saw the opening by Prince Charles of the Whitelaw Building, a multi-function business centre and teaching area which was named after the then chairman of the board of Governors, William Whitelaw. In 2000, Barony House was refurbished entirely and renamed the Fox Music Centre in memory of old St Beghian Bill Fox. To mark the millennium, a time capsule was buried in the north-east corner of the Quadrangle.

In September 2008, a Preparatory Department was launched, catering for pupils from the age of 8 until they joined the main school. At this time, a nearby independent school with a prep department, Harecroft Hall, had just closed. The school again expanded in September 2010 to include pupils from age four.

Closure and reopening 
On Friday 13 March 2015, it was announced without prior warning by the school governors that due to falling pupil numbers, the school would temporarily close in summer 2015. In response, a four-point rescue plan was proposed on 23 March by a "rescue team" made up of interested parties.

However, on 17 April 2015, it was confirmed by the governors that the school would close. A formal statement said that the governors were also trustees of the St Bees Foundation, and that they are committed to it having a future in education in west Cumbria and "to the use of the site as support both for the future activities of the foundation and the village of St Bees."
On 20 March 2017, it was announced that the school would re-open in a partnership with Full Circle Education Group after refurbishment. The school re-opened on 6 September 2018.

Academic performance 
The school's most recent Ofsted inspection was in 2018, six months after the school reopened with 10 pupils. Following this inspection, Ofsted inspectors rated the school 'good' on their quality scale.  One of the aims of St Bees is to provide an opportunity for pupils to appreciate the arts as well as to experience the benefit of time on stage and behind the scenes. Music is also featured strongly in the curriculum.

Old St. Beghians 

Former pupils of St Bees School are styled 'Old St. Beghians.' An Old St. Beghians' Club was founded in 1908 by master J. W. Aldous. Today, it is known as the 'Old St. Beghians' Society' and provides a link between old boys (and girls) and the school. Among other things, it organizes "Old St Beghians Day" once a year, publishes a magazine called the Old St. Beghian twice a year, and both holds and participates in many golfing tournaments. There are several regional branches of the society which traditionally hold annual meals and reunions.

Notable Old St. Beghains include two Vice-Chancellors of the University of Cambridge, a number of professors, and three Victoria Cross recipients. The comedian and actor Rowan Atkinson also attended the school as a pupil.

See also 

List of headmasters of St. Bees School
List of Old St. Beghians
List of the oldest schools in the United Kingdom
List of the oldest schools in the world
Listed buildings in St Bees

Citations

Reference list

External links 
St Bees School Website
Village of St. Bees Website
ISI Inspection Reports

1583 establishments in England
2015 disestablishments in England
Boarding schools in Cumbria
Educational institutions established in the 1580s
Educational institutions disestablished in 2015
Member schools of the Headmasters' and Headmistresses' Conference
St Bees
 
Private schools in Cumbria